Yoram Kaniuk (May 2, 1930 – June 8, 2013) was an Israeli writer, painter, journalist, and theatre critic.

Biography
Yoram Kaniuk was born in Tel Aviv. His father, Moshe Kaniuk, was the first curator of Tel Aviv Museum of Art and was born in Ternopil, Galicia, which is now in Ukraine but was then part of the Austro-Hungarian Empire. His grandfather was a Hebrew teacher who wrote his own textbooks. Kaniuk's mother, born in Odessa, was also a teacher. Her family immigrated to Palestine in 1909, the year Tel Aviv was founded, and settled in Neve Tzedek.

At the age of 17, Kaniuk joined the Palmach. In 1948, during the War of Independence, he was shot in the legs by an Englishman in a keffiyeh. He was treated at Mount Sinai Hospital in New York.

In 1958 while living in the USA, Kaniuk married Miranda Baker, a Christian woman, and returned to Israel with her. They had two daughters, Aya and Naomi.

Kaniuk died of cancer on June 8, 2013 at the age of 83. After his death, his body was donated to science.

Civil status
In May 2011, Kaniuk petitioned the Israeli Interior Ministry to change his religion status from "Jewish" to "religiously unclassified." The petition came after the birth of his grandson, Omri, who was registered as being "unclassified" due to not being Jewish under the Halakhic definition used by Israeli civil law. He cited the fact that his child and infant grandson, because they are descended from a mixed Jewish/Christian marriage, are legally "unclassified", and his desire not to belong to a "Jewish Iran" or "what is today called the religion of Israel."

In October 2011, The Hon. Judge Gideon Ginat of the Tel Aviv District Court approved his petition, removing his Jewish classification in the resident registration. The Rabbinate retained a veto over his status.  Hundreds of other Israelis intend to do the same; a new Hebrew verb, lehitkaniuk (to Kaniuk oneself) was coined to refer to this process.

Literary career
Kaniuk has published 17 novels, a memoir, seven collections of short stories, two books of essays and five books for children and youth. His books have been published in 25 languages and he has won numerous literary prizes.

An international conference dedicated to the works of Kaniuk was held at Cambridge University in March 2006.

Literary themes and style
'Eagles' is a war story that attacks the subject of death in Israeli culture from a unique angle. His work has been described as "existential writing that deviates from the Israeli consensus" and difficult to categorize.

He is known for the dark, somewhat bizarre humor in his writing. The late writers Anthony Burgess and Kurt Vonnegut have influenced his unsettling style of political satire. He was widely rejected by the Israeli mainstream until the 21st century, when many young readers found his unique take on the sensitive Israeli social climate refreshing.

Awards and honours
Kaniuk has won numerous literary prizes, including the following:
 In 1980, the Ze`ev Prize for Children's literature.
 In 1997, the Prix des Droits de l'Homme (France).
 In 1998, the President's Prize.
 In 1999, the Bialik Prize for literature (co-recipient with Aharon Almog and Nurit Zarchi).
 In 2000, the Prix Mediterranee Etranger for Commander of the Exodus.
 In 2005, the Book Publishers Association's Gold Book Prize.
 In 2006, the Newman Prize.  
 In 2011, the Sapir Prize for Literature for 1948.

Published works
 The Acrophile (1960)
 Himmo, King of Jerusalem (1968)
 Adam Resurrected (novel, 1971)
 Rockinghorse (1977) 
 The Story of Aunt Shlomzion the Great (1978) 
 Confessions of a Good Arab: a Novel (1984) 
 His Daughter (1987) 
 Tigerhill (1995)
 Commander of the Exodus (1999) 
 The House Where Cockroaches Live to a Ripe Old Age (2001) 
 Life on Sandpaper (2003) 
 The Last Jew (novel, 2006) 
 Eagles (novella)
 Villany (novella)
 Between Life and Death (novel)
 1948 (autobiographic novel)

See also
 List of Bialik Prize recipients
 Adam Resurrected (film)

References

External links

 Short biography with extensive list of works
 An English excerpt from his autobiographical novel "My Way"

1930 births
2013 deaths
Brenner Prize recipients
Israeli film critics
Israeli children's writers
Israeli essayists
Israeli literary critics
Israeli novelists
Israeli painters
Jewish atheists
Israeli atheists
Israeli people of Polish-Jewish descent
Israeli people of Ukrainian-Jewish descent
People from Tel Aviv
Deaths from cancer in Israel
20th-century novelists
20th-century essayists
Recipients of Prime Minister's Prize for Hebrew Literary Works